Bell railway station may refer to:

Bell railway station, Melbourne, Victoria, Australia 
Bell railway station, New South Wales, Australia